Cristian Ignacio Garín Medone (born 30 May 1996) is a Chilean professional tennis player. He has been ranked as high as world No. 17 by the Association of Tennis Professionals (ATP) in singles, which he first achieved on 13 September 2021, and is the current Chilean No. 2. He also has a career-high doubles ranking of world No. 206, achieved on 10 May 2021.

Garín became the youngest Chilean player to win an ATP Tour match, by defeating Dušan Lajović at 16 years and 8 months old in the first round of the 2013 VTR Open. He was the winner of the 2013 Junior French Open, beating Alexander Zverev in the final.

Garín has won five ATP tour titles, all on clay courts. In early 2019, he achieved his first consistent results in the ATP Tour, reaching three finals in five tournaments: he finished runner-up in the 2019 Brasil Open, won his first ATP title at the 2019 U.S. Men's Clay Court Championships, and won his second title at the 2019 BMW Open. Garín obtained his third title at the 2020 Córdoba Open. By winning his first ATP Tour 500 title at the 2020 Rio Open, Garín became the sixth-ever Chilean man to be ranked in the top 20.

Junior career
In 2010, Garín won the U14 world championship with Bastián Malla and Sebastián Santibáñez, defeating Italy in the final.
The next year, at 14 years old, Garín won his first ITF Junior title at the Pascuas Bowl, a Grade 5 tournament. In 2012 when Garín was 16 years old, he broke top ten in the ITF Junior Rankings after winning the Eddie Herr (G1) in singles and doubles and the Orange Bowl Doubles, partnering with Nicolás Jarry.

At the 2013 French Open, Garín reached his first Junior Grand Slam finals in both singles and doubles. He dropped only one set on his way to the singles final, meeting Alexander Zverev of Germany who he defeated in straight sets to win his first Junior Grand Slam title. In the doubles event, partnered by fellow Chilean Nicolás Jarry, they faced Kyle Edmund of Great Britain, and Portuguese Frederico Ferreira Silva, to whom they lost in two sets.

Professional career

2012
He entered in the ATP ranking in February, after defeating Felipe Mantilla in the F1 Chile. In March, he made his ATP Challenger debut, in the 2012 Cachantún Cup. He lost in three sets to Fernando Romboli. On 16 September, he became the youngest Chilean player to debut Davis Cup, before losing to Simone Bolelli. Garín made his best performance of the year in the F11 Chile in October, reaching the semifinals after defeating Juan Carlos Sáez, No. 435 in the ATP ranking.

2013: First pro win

In February, he received a wildcard for the main draw of the 2013 VTR Open, ATP 250 tournament. In the first round, he defeated Dušan Lajović in two sets, gaining 20 points for the ranking. He lost in three sets to Jérémy Chardy in the second round, after winning the first set.

He also represented his country on the 2nd round of the 2013 Davis Cup Americas Zone Group I against Ecuador, playing two single matches.

2014
In his first year as a professional, he received a wild card for 2014 Royal Guard Open, ATP 250 tournament in his home country, Chile. He couldn't repeat previous year second round, losing in his first match against Chardy in straight sets. The next week, he won a qualifier spot at main draw of 2014 Copa Claro, another ATP 250 event.
After these stints in ATP Tour, he spent most of the year between Challengers and Futures, winning four of the latter. He ended the year as world No. 252.

In January, he played for Chile in 2014 Davis Cup Americas Zone Group II, losing his singles match and doubles match. Chile lost against Barbados 3–2. Later, in march, he won two singles matches against the Paraguayan team.

2015
Garín did not reach any main draws of professional tournaments this year, having as year best results semifinals of challenger tournaments. In January, he played for Chile in 2015 Davis Cup Americas Zone Group II, winning his singles match against Perú, series that Chile won 5–0. In July, he won two singles matches against Mexico, series that Chile also won 5–0. In September, Garín with Hans Podlipnik won the doubles match against Venezuela, series that Chile won 5–0 too, and achieved the promotion for Group I. Garín ended the year as World No. 321.

2016: First Challenger title
Garín only played the 2016 Geneva Open in the professional tour, after winning in the qualifying draw. The rest of the season he took part of Challenger tournaments and Futures, winning four of the latter and achieving his first Challenger title in Lima, at the end of the season. Garín ended the year as world No. 211.

In January, he played for Chile in 2016 Davis Cup Americas Zone Group I, and won a singles match against Dominican Republic when the series was already decided, Chile won the series 5–0. In September, he played in 2016 Davis Cup World Group Play-offs, and lost two singles matches against Canada. Chile lost the series 5–0.

2017: Grand slam debut and top 200
Garín entered the top 200 in January, reaching world No. 187 the next month. Garín successfully made it through the qualifying draw of Wimbledon, at his first attempt. In the main draw, Garín lost in four sets against Jack Sock, 17th seed of the edition. Garín ended the year as world No. 311.

In January, he played for Chile in 2017 Davis Cup Americas Zone Group I, and won a singles match against Dominican Republic, Chile won the series 5–0. In April, he won a singles match and lost another one against Colombia, Chile lost the series 3–1.

2018: Three Challenger titles and top 100
After not being able to defend the points of last year's good start, Garín fell to world No. 373 in mid-January. Cristian was able to revert his fall with good presentations in Challenger tournaments, reaching three semifinals (and one final) out of six presentations in three months. In May, he reached another final. In July, he was able to defend his participation in Wimbledon, making it through the qualifying draw again, and losing to Adrian Mannarino in four sets in the first round. In September, Garín reached his third final of the year. As the Latin American swing of Challenger tournaments started in October, Garín won the Challenger of Campinas. Next week, he lifted the title at the Challenger of Santo Domingo. After a week of rest, Garín won another challenger, Lima, for the second time of his career. With this last tournament, Garín entered the top 100, at world No. 89. Garín ended his year with fifteen consecutive victories and three back-to-back titles at Challenger level.

In April, he played for Chile in 2018 Davis Cup Americas Zone Group I and lost two singles match against Argentina. Chile lost the series 3–2. However, 2018 was the seventh consecutive year for Garín representing his country at the Davis Cup, an impressive achievement considering he was only 21 years old at the time.

2019: Two ATP titles, first Masters quarterfinals and top 40

Garín entered a Grand Slam main draw directly for the first time in 2019 Australian Open, but lost in straight sets to David Goffin. This was also his first participation in the first Grand Slam of the year. After Australia, Cristian took part in the rubber for 2019 Davis Cup for Chile against Austria. Garín lost to Dennis Novak, but won the decisive match against Jurij Rodionov, giving the Chilean team its first win in Europe over 50 years; this also put Chile on the 2019 Davis Cup Finals, where they could not make it past the group stage.

In the last week of February, Garín reached his first ATP final, at the 2019 Brasil Open, but lost the title to Guido Pella in straight sets. After losing in the qualifying round of the 2019 Miami Open, Garín started preparing for the upcoming clay-court season. 

In the second week of April, he returned to the circuit with a great run at the 2019 U.S. Men's Clay Court Championships in Houston, Texas, where he ended up winning the tournament. On his way to the final, Garín defeated Pablo Cuevas, Jérémy Chardy, Henri Laaksonen and Sam Querrey, before facing the 20-year old Norwegian Casper Ruud in his second final of the season. Both players were aiming for their maiden ATP Tour title and the match went on to the third set, where Garín finally broke Ruud's serve and clinched a final win. This was the first title for a Chilean since 2009, when Fernando González won the title at the Chilean Open.

In late April Garín arrived to Europe, winning his first ATP match outside the Americas against Martin Kližan in Barcelona, where he went on to reach the third round after defeating Canadian rising star Denis Shapovalov. The following week, he went on to win his second title of the season in Munich, including stunning victories against clay-court specialists such as world No. 26 Diego Schwartzman, world No. 3 Alexander Zverev and world No. 19 Marco Cecchinato. In the final he defeated Budapest champion Matteo Berrettini in three sets, becoming the first Chilean to win an ATP tournament in Europe in more than a decade.

After losing in straight sets to Stan Wawrinka in the second round of the 2019 French Open, Garín won only two matches in the grass season, both at the 2019 Rosmalen Grass Court Championships where he made the quarterfinals. Highlights of Garín's second semester include reaching the round of 16 in the 2019 Rogers Cup (recording a first win against world No. 15 and former top-10 John Isner), reaching the quarter-finals in the 2019 Chengdu Open and his participation in the 2019 Rolex Paris Masters. In this last tournament, Garin recorded wins against Pablo Cuevas, world No. 17 John Isner and Jérémy Chardy. He lost in the quarterfinals against Grigor Dimitrov. However, it was the first time Garín reached such an advanced stage in a high category event (ATP Tour Masters 1000).

2020: Two titles in one month and top 20
Garín started his year representing Chile at the 2020 ATP Cup. As the No. 1 player of his country, he played against Gaël Monfils, Kevin Anderson and Novak Djokovic, losing all three matches as his team went home last place in their group. Cristian also won his first Australian Open match, defeating Stefano Travaglia before losing to Milos Raonic in the next round.

At the Golden Swing, Garín entered the Córdoba Open as the No. 3 seed. He won his third title after making comebacks in three of his four matches (despite losing in the first set), including the final against local favorite and world No. 14 Diego Schwartzman. After skipping the Argentina Open due to medical reasons, he took part in the 2020 Rio Open. Garín entered as the No. 3 seed, behind world No. 22 Dušan Lajović and world No. 4 Dominic Thiem. After a difficult start to the tournament (with a very contested three set thriller against Andrej Martin), Garín went on to the final by winning against Federico Delbonis, Federico Coria and No. 5 seed Borna Ćorić. After winning the first set on a tiebreak, Garín came back from a 3–5 deficit in the second set of the final against Gianluca Mager to win the match; thus obtaining his first ATP 500 title. With the win, Garín appeared in the top 20 of the ATP Tour world ranking for the first time in his career (being only the sixth Chilean man in history to do so), as world No. 18. Less than a week later, Garín would enter the 2020 Chile Open as a local and first seed. However, after receiving a bye in the first round and winning a very contested second-round match against Alejandro Davidovich Fokina, he was forced to retire (due to a back injury) after a set in his match against eventual champion Thiago Seyboth Wild. Even so, Garín would retain his world No. 18 ranking after the tournament.

Due to the suspension of the 2020 ATP Tour because of the COVID-19 pandemic, Garín (as the rest of professional tennis players) did not play in any professional tournaments until June 7.

Garín returned to competitions on August at 2020 Western & Southern Open, which took part in New York; Garín lost in the first round to Aljaž Bedene. A week later, he reached second round of the 2020 US Open. After the American tournaments, Garín travelled to Europe for the clay-court tournaments. Despite a first round exit at the 2020 Italian Open (tennis), he bounced back with a semifinals appearance at the 2020 Hamburg European Open (getting wins over Kei Nishikori, Yannick Hanfmann and Alexander Bublik), losing in three tight sets to Stefanos Tsitsipas. He defeated Philipp Kohlschreiber and Marc Polmans before losing to Karen Khachanov at the third round of the 2020 French Open. After this, Garín participated in only one more professional tournament, the 2020 Erste Bank Open; getting a first round win over world No. 19 Stan Wawrinka before losing to Dominic Thiem.

2021: Title on home soil, second Masters quarterfinal 
Garín started his 2021 season at the Delray Beach Open. As the top seed, he lost in the first round to American qualifier Christian Harrison. He withdrew from the Australian Open due to suffering a fall in which he injured his left wrist. Also, he didn't travel to Melbourne due to the limitations in place at the tournament which wouldn’t allow him to travel with his physio played a factor. This year’s Australian Open is taking place amid strict COVID-19 rules which requires players to quarantine for 14 days upon arrival and limits the number of team members they can bring. 

Garín returned to play in March competing at the Argentina Open. Seeded second, he was defeated in the second round by qualifier Sumit Nagal. As the top seed at the Chile Open, he won his fifth career ATP tour title by beating Facundo Bagnis in the final. Seeded 13th at the Miami Open, he fell in the second round to Marin Čilić.

Garín started his clay-court season at the Monte-Carlo Masters. He reached the third round where he lost to fourth seed, world No. 5, and eventual champion, Stefanos Tsitsipas. At the same tournament, in doubles, he partnered with Guido Pella to reach his first quarterfinal in doubles at a Masters 1000. They ended up losing to the fourth-seeded pair of Marcel Granollers/Horacio Zeballos. Seeded 13th at the Barcelona Open, he was eliminated in the second round by Kei Nishikori. Seeded second at the Estoril Open, he reached the quarterfinals where he lost to eventual finalist Cam Norrie. Seeded 16th at the Madrid Open, Garín upset second seed and world No. 3, Daniil Medvedev, in the third round to advance to his second Masters 1000 quarterfinals and his first on a clay court. He ended up losing to eighth seed, world No. 10, and eventual finalist, Matteo Berrettini. In Rome, he lost in the second round to 10th seed and world No. 11, Roberto Bautista Agut. Seeded 22nd at the French Open, Garín made his best Grand Slam run in his career by reaching the fourth round; he lost to world No. 2 Daniil Medvedev.

Seeded 17th at Wimbledon, Garín reached the fourth round for the first time in his career and second time in a row at a major in 2021. He ended up losing to world No. 1, five-time champion, and eventual champion, Novak Djokovic. He is the first Chilean to reach the fourth round of Wimbledon since Fernando González ran to the last eight in 2005.

After Wimbledon, Garín competed at the Swedish Open. Seeded second, he reached the quarterfinals where he lost to eventual finalist Federico Coria. Seeded fourth at the Swiss Open, he made it to the quarterfinals where he was defeated by eventual finalist, Hugo Gaston, despite having four match points in the third-set tiebreaker.

In August, Garín played at the National Bank Open in Toronto. Seeded 13th, he lost in the second round to eventual semifinalist John Isner. Seeded 16th at the Western & Southern Open in Cincinnati, he fell in the first round to American qualifier Tommy Paul. Despite this result, he reached the second round of the US Open and reached a career-high ranking of World No. 17 on 13 September 2021.

2022: Rome Masters and Wimbledon quarterfinals
Garín started his 2022 season by representing Chile at the ATP Cup. Chile was in Group A alongside Spain, Serbia, and Norway. He lost his first match to Roberto Bautista Agut of Spain. In his second match, he beat Dušan Lajović of Serbia via retirement. In his third match, he lost to Casper Ruud of Norway. In the end, Chile ended second in Group A. Seeded 16th at the Australian Open, he reached the third round where he was defeated by 17th seed and world No. 20, Gaël Monfils.

Seeded third at the Córdoba Open, Garín was eliminated in the second round by Sebastián Báez. Seeded fifth at the Rio Open, he was the defending champion from when the event was last held in 2020. He was beaten in the first round by Federico Coria. As the top seed and defending champion at the Chile Open, he fell in the second round to compatriot Alejandro Tabilo.

After his loss in Santiago, Garín admitted that he wasn't in a good place, and he hinted that he might decide to stop his career due to being plagued by a shoulder injury for quite some time and for his struggling form. He returned to action at the Miami Open. Seeded 27th, he was beaten in the second round by Pedro Martínez.

Garín started his clay-court season at the 2022 U.S. Men's Clay Court Championships in Houston. Seeded fifth, he was the defending champion from when the tournament was last held in 2019. He beat second seed, world No. 13, and American, Taylor Fritz, in the quarterfinals. He lost in his semifinal match to fourth seed and world No. 27, John Isner, in three sets. Garín pulled out of the Monte-Carlo Masters due to unknown reasons. Seeded fifth at the Serbia Open, he was defeated in the first round by Holger Rune. Seeded fifth at the BMW Open in Munich, he was eliminated in the first round by lucky loser Alejandro Tabilo. In Madrid, he was beaten in the second round by eighth seed and world No. 10, Félix Auger-Aliassime. At the Italian Open, Garín reached his third career Masters 1000 quarterfinals. He ended up losing to second seed, world No. 3, and 2017 champion, Alexander Zverev. Ranked 37 at the French Open, he defeated 30th seed and world No. 33, Tommy Paul, in the first round. He lost in the third round to seventh seed, Andrey Rublev, in a tight four-set match.

Garín started his grass-court season at the Halle Open. He lost in the first round to Sebastian Korda. In Eastbourne, he was defeated in the first round by sixth seed and defending champion, Alex de Minaur. Ranked 43 at Wimbledon, he beat 29th seed, Jenson Brooksby, in the third round to reach the fourth round for the second consecutive year. He then stunned 19th seed and world No. 27, Alex de Minaur, in a tight five-set match to reach the first Grand Slam quarterfinal of his career. Garin was just the eighth Chilean male player to reach a Grand Slam quarterfinal, and the fourth to do so at Wimbledon after Luis Ayala, Ricardo Acuña and Fernando González. His run came to an end as he lost in the quarterfinals to eventual finalist Nick Kyrgios.

Seeded sixth at the Swiss Open, Garín suffered a first-round loss at the hands of qualifier Yannick Hanfmann. At the Generali Open Kitzbühel in Kitzbühel, Austria, he lost in the first round to Federico Coria.

Due to a wrist injury, Garín missed the National Bank Open and the Western & Southern Open. Ranked 82 at the US Open, he lost in the second round to 18th seed and world No. 20, Alex de Minaur, in four sets.

In October, Garin played at Astana Open. He lost in the first round to fourth seed, world No. 7, and eventual champion, Novak Djokovic. At the first edition of the Firenze Open, he was defeated in the first round by seventh seed Alexander Bublik. In Stockholm, he was beaten in the second round by seventh seed, world No. 27, and eventual champion, Holger Rune. At the Vienna Open, he lost in the first round to sixth seed and world No. 12, Jannik Sinner.

2023: 100th career and third top-5 win, back to top 80
Garín started his 2023 season at the Open Nouvelle-Calédonie in Nouméa, New Caledonia. As the top seed, he reached the semifinals where he lost to Raúl Brancaccio. At the Australian Open, he was defeated in the first round by 29th seed and eventual quarterfinalist, Sebastian Korda.

After the Australian Open, Garín represented Chile in the Davis Cup tie against Kazakhstan. He lost his first match to Timofey Skatov; however, he won his second match over Alexander Bublik. In the end, Chile won the tie 3-1 over Kazakhstan to qualify for the Davis Cup Finals. At the Córdoba Open, he recorded his 101th ATP singles match win by beating seventh seed, Pedro Martinez, in the first round. He was eliminated from the tournament in the second round by João Sousa. In Rio, he lost in the first round to Pedro Martinez. At his home tournament in Chile, he defeated Dominic Thiem in straight sets in the first round. He was beaten in the second round by third seed and last year finalist, Sebastián Báez. Getting past qualifying at the BNP Paribas Open, he defeated Daniel Elahi Galán in the first round. In the second round, he beat 28th seed Yoshihito Nishioka. In the third round, he stunned third seed and world No. 4, Casper Ruud, for his third top-5 win to reach the fourth round for the first time at this tournament. As a result he returned to the top 80 in the rankings.

Performance timelines

Singles
Current through the 2023 BNP Paribas Open.

Doubles

ATP career finals

Singles: 6 (5 titles, 1 runner-up)

ATP Challengers and ITF Futures finals

Singles: 17 (12 titles, 5 runner–ups)

Doubles: 7 (2 titles, 5 runner–ups)

Junior Grand Slam finals

Singles: 1 (1 title)

Doubles: 1 (1 runner-up)

Record against top 10 players
Garín's record against players who have been ranked in the top 10, with those who are active in boldface. Only ATP Tour main draw matches are considered:

Record against No. 11–20 players
Garín's record against players who have been ranked world No. 11–20:

 Pablo Cuevas 4–0
 Kyle Edmund 1–0
 Philipp Kohlschreiber 1–0
 Sam Querrey 1–0
 Frances Tiafoe 1–0
 Marco Cecchinato 1–1
 Reilly Opelka 1–1
 Borna Ćorić 1–2
 Alex de Minaur 1–4
 Nick Kyrgios 0–1
 Andreas Seppi 0–1
 Guido Pella 0–2

* Statistics correct .

Wins over top 10 opponents
He has a  record against players who were, at the time the match was played, ranked in the top 10.

Davis Cup

Participations (13-14)

   indicates the outcome of the Davis Cup match followed by the score, date, place of event, the zonal classification and its phase, and the court surface.

Personal life
On 26 November 2022, Garín married Melanie Goldberg.

Notes

References

External links
 
 

Chilean male tennis players
1996 births
Living people
French Open junior champions
Chilean people of Italian descent
Grand Slam (tennis) champions in boys' singles
People from Arica